The John W. Gallivan Utah Center (commonly known as the Gallivan Center), is an urban plaza in the heart of Downtown Salt Lake City, Utah, United States.

Description

The plaza, which has been described as "Salt Lake City's outdoor living room", was named in honor of named in honor of John W. Gallivan, the former, long-time publisher of The Salt Lake Tribune. The plaza is situated between East 200 South on the north, the Salt Lake City Marriott Hotel City Center on the east, East Gallivan Avenue on the south, the Wells Fargo Center on the southwest, and the One Utah Center on the northeast. An adjacent TRAX station (Gallivan Plaza) takes its name from the plaza. (The light rail station is served by the Blue and Green lines).

The plaza was a popular gathering place during the 2002 Olympic Winter Games. Kazuo Matsubayashi's Asteroid Landed Softly sundial is one of the prominent features of the plaza, in addition to several other works of public art. The plaza also includes a seasonal ice skating rink that serves as a racquetball and basketball court during warmer months. The plaza is also the center of Salt Lake City's First Night celebrations.

The Gallivan Center is owned by the Redevelopment Agency (RDA) of Salt Lake City. Salt Lake City Public Services has partnered with RDA to provide the management, programming and maintenance.

History

The site of the Gallivan Center was formerly identified as "Block 57" and consisted of rundown buildings and parking lots. The RDA began construction on the project in August 1992, but work continued past the opening date (July 1993) until the project was completed in November 1998. In 2012 the original ice rink was replaced by a LEED Gold certified facility.

See also
 Peace Cradle

References

External links

 
 Gallivan Center at slc.gov

Parks in Salt Lake City
Squares and plazas in Salt Lake City